Richard Rabasa (5 July 1931 – 19 February 2011) was a French ski jumper. He competed in the individual event at the 1956 Winter Olympics.

References

1931 births
2011 deaths
French male ski jumpers
Olympic ski jumpers of France
Ski jumpers at the 1956 Winter Olympics
Place of birth missing